The Canon EOS D30 is a discontinued 3.1-megapixel professional digital single lens reflex camera (DSLR) body, initially announced by Canon on May 17, 2000. It is part of the Canon EOS line of cameras and uses the EF lens mount. The EOS D30 was Canon's first "home grown" digital SLR. Before that point Canon had a contract with Kodak to rebrand the Kodak 2-megapixel DCS 520 as Canon EOS D2000 and the 6-megapixel DCS 560 as Canon EOS D6000 digital SLRs, which combined Kodak digital backs and Canon camera bodies.

The D30 was succeeded by the 6.3-megapixel D60 in 2002.

Features
 22.7 x 15.1 mm CMOS sensor (APS-C)
 3.1 megapixel effective (3.3 megapixel total)
 Max resolution 2160 x 1440
 FOV crop (1.6x)
 Canon EF lens mount (excludes EF-S)
 3-point auto focus
 100, 200, 400, 800, 1600 ISO speed equivalent
 30 to 1/4000 s shutter speed and bulb
 TTL 35 zone SPC metering: evaluative, center weighted, partial
 Exposure compensation -2 EV to +2 EV in 1/3 EV or 1/2 EV steps
 Auto White Balance (plus 5 positions & manual preset)
 Eye-level pentaprism viewfinder
 1.8 in (46 mm) color TFT liquid-crystal monitor
 E-TTL flash mode
 Built-in Flash
 3 frames per second continuous shooting (max. 8 frames)
 Dimensions (WxHxD): 150 x 107 x 75 mm
 Weight (body only): 780 g
 Optional BG-ED3 battery grip

References

External links

 D30 page at Canon U.S.A.

D30